Acrocercops hyphantica is a moth of the family Gracillariidae, known from Bihar, India. It was described by Edward Meyrick in 1912. The hostplants for the species include Caesalpinia bonduc and Caesalpinia decapetala.

References

hyphantica
Moths of Asia
Moths described in 1912